The 2017 Dafabet Northern Ireland Open was a professional ranking snooker tournament that took place between 20 and 26 November 2017 in the Waterfront Hall in Belfast, Northern Ireland. It was the tenth ranking event of the 2017/2018 season and a part of the Home Nations Series. It was the second edition of the Northern Ireland Open.

Mark King was the defending champion, but he was beaten 1–4 in the third round by Yan Bingtao. Yan went on to reach the final, becoming the youngest ever finalist of a ranking event. He faced Mark Williams, who won the 19th ranking title of his career by beating Yan 9–8. Williams had come from 7–8 behind to win, and denied Yan becoming the youngest ever winner of a ranking event. Ronnie O'Sullivan still holds that record for the 1993 UK Championship.

Prize fund
The breakdown of prize money for this year is shown below:

 Winner: £70,000
 Runner-up: £30,000
 Semi-final: £20,000
 Quarter-final: £10,000
 Last 16: £6,000
 Last 32: £3,500
 Last 64: £2,500

 Highest break: £2,000
 Total: £366,000

The "rolling 147 prize" for a maximum break stood at £10,000

Main draw

Top half

Section 1

Section 2

Section 3

Section 4

Bottom half

Section 5

Section 6

Section 7

Section 8

Finals

Final

Century breaks
Total: 53

 142, 135, 107  John Higgins
 140, 120  Kurt Maflin
 138, 129  Stephen Maguire
 138  Ben Woollaston
 137, 114, 113  Yan Bingtao
 137  Lukas Kleckers
 134  Dominic Dale
 134  Ryan Day
 132, 105  Robert Milkins
 131  Li Yuan
 129, 107  Joe Perry
 129  Gary Wilson
 128  Robin Hull
 127, 113, 106, 104  Mark Williams
 126  Ronnie O'Sullivan
 125, 119  Sunny Akani
 125  Anthony McGill
 115, 107, 105  Thepchaiya Un-Nooh
 113, 108  Matthew Selt
 110, 106  Sam Craigie
 110  Xiao Guodong
 109, 106  Tian Pengfei
 108  Allan Taylor
 106  Paul Davison
 105  Kyren Wilson
 104  Neil Robertson
 104  Yuan Sijun
 103, 103  Zhou Yuelong
 103  Ken Doherty
 103  Michael Holt
 102  Cao Yupeng
 101, 100  Jack Lisowski
 101  Tom Ford
 101  Chen Zifan

References

Home Nations Series
2017
2017 in snooker
2017 in Northern Ireland sport
Sports competitions in Belfast
2010s in Northern Ireland
21st century in Belfast
November 2017 sports events in the United Kingdom